Kufra Airport  is an airport serving Al Jawf, capital of the Kufra District in southeastern Libya. The airport is just east of the city.

History 
Kufra Airport began as Buma Airfield, built in the 1930s as a minor facility by the Italians. In early World War II, it provided an air link to Italian East Africa (Ethiopia, Eritrea, and Italian Somaliland). It was captured by Free French units under General Leclerc on 1 March 1941 along with Kufra Oasis.

In April 1942 a detachment of Squadron 16 of the South African Air Force with three Bristol Blenheim Mk. IV aircraft was ordered to Kufra under the command of Major J.L.V. de Wet to strengthen the garrison air defences. On the morning of 4 May 1942 the three aircraft took off on a familiarization mission. They became lost and landed about 150 kilometres North East of Kufra. A sandstorm thwarted ground and air search parties, and by the time the lost aircraft were located on 11 May only one of the total 12-man crew was alive.

On 26 August 2008, a hijacked Sudanese Boeing 737 landed at Kufra Airport after having departed at Nyala Airport, Darfur, with destination Khartoum. Earlier, Egyptian authorities had refused the plane to land in their national capital, Cairo.

Libyan Airlines operated a twice weekly service from Benghasi with Boeing 727-200 equipment for at least ten years prior to its suspension in 2004. For a couple of years leading up to the revolution Tibesti Airlines (later renamed Air Libya) operated a twice weekly Benghasi - Kufra - Khartum service with a leased British Aerospace 146 aircraft. Air Libya also operated an intermittent weekly direct flight to Tripoli with a Boeing 727-200.

In July 2013 Libyan Airlines re-launched the Benghasi service that was suspended nine years earlier. During the same month a 2010 contract with Italian company Salini Costruttori to upgrade the airport's runway and taxiways (put on hold due to the 2011 civil war) was reactivated, with the works slated to take 20 months.

Airline and destinations

See also
Transport in Libya
List of airports in Libya

References

External links
SkyVector - Kufra Airport

FallingRain - Kufra Airport

Airports in Libya
Kufra District